The 1928 Ohio State Buckeyes football team represented Ohio State University as a member of the Big Ten Conference duiring the 1928 college football season. The Buckeyes compiled a 5–2–1 record and got their first win over Michigan in six seasons. They Buckeyes outscored their opponents 135–35. It was John Wilce's last season as head coach. He finished his tenure at Ohio State with a 78–33–9 record and 4–7 against Michigan with three Big Ten Conference titles.

Schedule

Coaching staff
 John Wilce, head coach, 16th year

References

Ohio State
Ohio State Buckeyes football seasons
Ohio State Buckeyes football